Corporal James Dunne (December 26, 1840 – February 13, 1915) was an American soldier who fought in the American Civil War. Dunne received the country's highest award for bravery during combat, the Medal of Honor, for his action during the Battle of Vicksburg in Mississippi on May 22, 1863. He was honored with the award on January 15, 1895.

Biography

Dunne was born in Detroit, Michigan, on December 26, 1840. He enlisted into the Illinois Light Artillery. He died on February 13, 1915, and his remains are interred at the Calvary Cemetery in Evanston, Illinois.

Medal of Honor citation

See also

List of American Civil War Medal of Honor recipients: A–F

References

1840 births
1915 deaths
People of Illinois in the American Civil War
Union Army officers
United States Army Medal of Honor recipients
American Civil War recipients of the Medal of Honor
Burials at Calvary Cemetery (Evanston, Illinois)